Codenames is a 2015 party card game designed by Vlaada Chvátil and published by Czech Games Edition. Two teams compete by each having a "spymaster" give one-word clues that can point to multiple words on the board. The other players on the team attempt to guess their team's words while avoiding the words of the other team. Codenames received positive reviews and won the 2016 Spiel des Jahres award for the best board game of the year.

Rules
Codenames is a game of guessing which codenames (i.e., words) in a set are related to a hint-word given by another player.

The game is played with least four players, or any even number of players. Players are split into two teams: blue and red. One player in each team is selected as the team's spymaster; the rest become field operatives.

Twenty-five codename cards, each bearing a word, are laid out in a 5×5 grid in random order. A number of these words represent blue agents, a number represent red agents, one represents an assassin, and the rest represent innocent bystanders. The teams' spymasters are given a randomly-dealt key card showing a 5×5 grid of 25 squares of various colors, each corresponding to one of the codename cards on the table. The key card can be rotated at the spymasters' will before being put into a stand. The 'lights' on the edges of the key card indicate which team plays first and has to find nine agents of their own (the other team only has to find eight).

On each turn, the appropriate spymaster gives a verbal hint (also known as clue) about the words on the respective cards. Each hint may only consist of one single word and a number. The clue has to be related to as many of the words on the team's own agents' cards as possible, but not to any others – lest the words accidentally lead them to choose a card representing an innocent bystander, an opposing agent, or the assassin. The clue word can be chosen freely, as long as it is not (and does not contain, nor is contained in) any of the words on the codename cards still visible at the time. Codename cards are covered as guesses, correct or otherwise, are made. If the spymaster of a team gives an invalid clue (their clue is explicitly invalidated by the opposing team's spymaster), their turn ends immediately and, as a penalty, the opposing team's spymaster randomly covers a codename belonging to one of their agents before the start of their turn.

The number in the hint tells the field operatives how many words in the grid are related to the clue word. It also determines the maximum number of guesses the field operatives may make on that turn, which is the stated number plus one. The field operatives of a team are required to make at least one guess per turn, risking a wrong guess and its consequences. If their first guess is right, the field operatives may continue to make guesses until they reach the guess limit or make a wrong guess, or they can instead choose to end their turn voluntarily. For a faster game, or if the opposing team is taking too long to think for example, a timer, such as the hourglass included with the game's packaging, may be used.

After a spymaster gives a clue with its word and number, their field operatives make guesses about which codename cards bear words related to the clue and point them out, one at a time. When a codename card is pointed out, the spymaster covers that card with an appropriate identity card – a blue agent, a red agent, an innocent bystander, or the assassin – as indicated on the spymasters' map of the grid. Revealing an opposing agent ends the team's turn, as does revealing an innocent bystander, though in the former case, the opposing team also gets a small advantage before the start of their turn as a result. If the assassin is revealed, the game ends immediately with a loss for the team who identified him.

Besides the aforementioned assassin, the game ends when all agents belonging to one team are identified, winning the game for that team. Given the nature of the gameplay, it is possible for a team to win the game during the opponents' turn.

Official variations

Codenames: Deep Undercover was released in 2016 exclusively at Target Stores. Published by Lark & Clam and marketed as an adult party game, the game's 200 new word cards contain sexual references and double entendres, earning it a parental advisory label. The game received an update in 2018 under the subtitle [2.0], which intends to achieve better gameplay balance.

Codenames: Pictures was released in September 2016, and includes 200 two-sided cards that feature images instead of words. The game uses a 5x4 grid instead of the original's 5x5, resulting in 20 cards being used at a time, but otherwise has the same rules as the original. The image cards themselves can also be combined with the word cards from the original game for a more advanced gameplay variation.

Codenames: Disney Family Edition was released in September 2017, featuring characters and locations from Disney and Pixar films and including an easier 4x4 grid gameplay (with no 'Game Over' square) for younger players. Codenames: Marvel Edition was released around the same time, featuring characters from the Marvel Universe, such as Spider-Man, Doctor Strange, Iron Man and Captain America. Both of these editions come with their own clue cards, which can be flipped over to display the picture or the word.

Codenames: Duet was released in October 2017 as a two-player cooperative version of the original game. The game packaging includes 200 new word cards, which can also be used for the original game (provided that the language matches). The objective of the game is to reveal all 15 agents within a given number of turns without contacting too many innocent bystanders or the Assassin.

Codenames: Harry Potter was released in 2018. Themed around the novel series of the same name, it is played similarly to Codenames: Duet, with two or more players working together to reveal all Order of the Phoenix members before they run out of time, while also trying to avoid the Ministry of Magic and the Death Eaters.

Codenames: XXL was released in June 2018, Codenames: Pictures XXL in November 2018, and Codenames: Duet XXL in May 2019. They are all the same as their respective original games, except for the fact that they use a larger format and double-sized cards.

Codenames: The Simpsons Family Edition was released in November 2019 and features characters and references from the eponymous television series. Its gameplay is identical to Codenames: Pictures. One month later, CGE released another licensed spin-off called Codenames: Blizzard Edition, featuring characters and references from the video game franchises by Blizzard Entertainment, such as Warcraft and Diablo. This particular edition is never available for retail, and was gifted exclusively to Blizzard employees around Christmas.

Digital
CGE has released Codenames Gadget, a mobile app to randomly generate layouts of agents. The publisher has also released an official web version of the game and Codenames Duet through their website.

Reception
Codenames received positive reviews upon its release. Nate Anderson from Ars Technica praised the strategy and engagement, but criticised the downtime. He concluded that it was a "terrific choice for a family friendly game". Writing for Kotaku, Alex Walker stated that the game had high replayability, and commended the mechanics. Oliver East also commented on the game's entertainment value and described it as an "instant hit". The game was commercially acclaimed, and has been published in 38 languages (Afrikaans, Arabic, Brazilian Portuguese, Bulgarian, Catalan, Chinese, Croatian, Czech, Danish, Dutch, English, Estonian, Filipino, Finnish, French, German, Greek, Hebrew, Hungarian, Icelandic, Indonesian, Italian, Japanese, Korean, Latvian, Lithuanian, Norwegian [Bokmål], Polish, [European] Portuguese, Romanian, Russian, Serbian, Slovak, Slovene, Spanish, Swedish, Thai and Turkish), comprising six different alphabets.

Awards

References

External links 
 Official game website at Czech Games
 5:27 Rules Overview video, linked from Official game website, on Youtube.com
 Codenames at BoardGameGeek

Board games introduced in 2015
Czech Games Edition games
Czech board games
Origins Award winners
Party board games